Dusty Wolfe (born Barry Dale Wolfe on July 18, 1962), occasionally billed as Dale Wolfe and occasionally appearing as Doink the Clown, is an American retired professional wrestler.

Professional wrestling career 
Wolfe was trained by fellow wrestler Ken Johnson, who helped Shawn Michaels enter professional wrestling (Johnson was later a co-owner of Texas Wrestling Academy with Michaels). He debuted on July 5, 1982 in San Antonio, Texas.

Wolfe is best known for his long tenure as a jobber in what was then known as the WWF, making his debut there as Dusty Wolfe in March 1987. In June 1989, WWF began billing him as Dale Wolfe so as to distinguish him from Dusty Rhodes, who had just left World Championship Wrestling (WCW) for the WWF (the two wrestled each other on television later that year). During his time in the WWF, Wolfe wrestled as both a babyface and a heel.

He was respected for his ability to work with, and put over, major stars, working with many of the WWF's top names from 1987 to 1993. He also wrestled for Fritz Von Erich in World Class Championship Wrestling (WCCW), and appeared frequently in the NWA territories and independently, where he would typically appear near the top of the bill. Wolfe also worked for the World Wrestling Council (WWC) in Puerto Rico where he was a two-time tag team champion. In 1996, he made several appearances in World Championship Wrestling at WCW Saturday Night TV tapings. Wolfe remained under contract with WCW until 1998, but was not used after 1996.

Wolfe is one of five people licensed to wrestle as Doink the Clown.

Later life 
After retiring completely from wrestling, Wolfe attended the San Antonio branch of Texas A&M University, where his grades were sufficient to qualify him for membership in the Phi Alpha Theta Honor Society; in 2012, he graduated with a bachelor's degree in history. He then attended Sam Houston State University, where he obtained a master's degree. He has taught history classes at Northwest Vista College since 2015.

Wolfe has published a number of books and essays about the wrestling industry since 2008. Wolfe is married and has four children (one of whom is named after wrestler Dick Murdoch).

Championships and accomplishments 
Flemish Wrestling Force
FWF Tag Team Championship (1 time) - with Rob Raw
NWA New Zealand/Steve Rickard promotions 
Asian Jr. Heavyweight Championship (1 time)
Southeastern Championship Wrestling
SCW Open Champion (1 time)
SCW Tag Team Championship (2 times) - with James Claxton (1) and Ken Johnson (1)
World Class Championship Wrestling
WCCW Heavyweight Championship (90’s Arkansas version) (1 time)
World Wrestling Council
WWC Caribbean Tag Team Championship (1 time) - with Galan Mendoza
WWC World Tag Team Championship (2 times) - with Mohammed Hussein
Xtreme Championship Wrestling
XCW Ironman Championship (1 time)

Published works 
 Journal Of A Journeyman (2008), 
 The Wrestling Journeyman: Life and Times of an Indy Wrestler (2016),

References

External links 
 

1962 births
20th-century professional wrestlers
American male professional wrestlers
Living people
People from San Antonio
Professional wrestlers from Texas